Li Yujie may refer to:

Li Yujie (taekwondo) (born 2001), Chinese parataekwondo practitioner
Li Yujie (admiral) (born 1962), vice admiral of the People's Liberation Army (PLA)